Bob Pickens (February 2, 1943 – April 12, 2018) was a player in the National Football League (NFL). He was drafted in the third round of the 1966 NFL Draft by the Chicago Bears and later played three seasons with the team. Pickens was also an Olympic wrestler, competing in Tokyo, Japan in the heavyweight division at the 1964 Summer Olympics. He was an NCAA national runner-up during his career at the University of Nebraska, transferring there after originally attending Wisconsin. After his pro football career, Pickens became a referee, officiating in the Big Ten Conference and a number of postseason games including the Rose Bowl. He also served on the Chicago Park District Board for several years.

References

1943 births
2018 deaths
20th-century African-American sportspeople
21st-century African-American sportspeople
American football offensive tackles
Canadian football offensive linemen
American male sport wrestlers
Olympic wrestlers of the United States
Wrestlers at the 1964 Summer Olympics
Chicago Bears players
Edmonton Elks players
Nebraska Cornhuskers wrestlers
Nebraska Cornhuskers football players
African-American players of American football
African-American players of Canadian football
Players of American football from Chicago
Players of Canadian football from Chicago
Wisconsin Badgers football players
Olympic wrestlers of the National Football League